A. Sudalaimuthu was elected to the Tamil Nadu Legislative Assembly from the Bodinayakkanur constituency in the 1996 elections. He was a candidate of the Dravida Munnetra Kazhagam (DMK) party.
Winner in election by vote difference of 27000 votes. He died at the age of 70 at 21 March 2009.

Ex.Military man. 
Wife : Suriyagandhi.
Son / Daughter: S. Sonai Muthu Parameshwari, S. Murugan Rani, & S. Vijaya Selva Raj, and his grandson / granddaughter: S.Santhosh, P.Nandhini, M. Harish & M. Deepa Surya.

References 

Tamil Nadu MLAs 1996–2001
Dravida Munnetra Kazhagam politicians
Year of birth missing
Possibly living people